Dushko Trajchevski (born 1 November 1990 in Skopje) is a Macedonian footballer who plays for Doxa Katokopias as a defensive midfielder.

International career
He made his senior debut for Macedonia in a March 2015 friendly match against Australia and has earned a total of 5 caps, scoring no goals. His final international was a June 2017 friendly against Turkey.

Notes

Honours

Club
Rabotnichki
Macedonian First League: 2013–14
Macedonian Football Cup: 2013–14, 2014–15

References

External links
 
 

1990 births
Living people
Footballers from Skopje
Association football midfielders
Macedonian footballers
North Macedonia international footballers
FK Teteks players
FK Rabotnički players
Alki Oroklini players
Doxa Katokopias FC players
Macedonian First Football League players
Cypriot First Division players
Macedonian expatriate footballers
Expatriate footballers in Cyprus
Macedonian expatriate sportspeople in Cyprus